Tununiq (formerly Tunniniq) is a territorial electoral district (riding) for the Legislative Assembly of Nunavut, Canada.

The riding consists of the community of Pond Inlet.

History
The electoral district was named for the Pond Inlet area. There was a typo in the original legislation, and was corrected by amendments passed in the Assembly.

Election results

1999 election

2004 election

2006 by-election

2008 election

2011 by-election

2013 election

2017 election

2019 by-election

References

External links
Website of the Legislative Assembly of Nunavut
By-election results

Electoral districts of Qikiqtaaluk Region
1999 establishments in Nunavut